Česko Slovenská SuperStar (English: Czech&Slovak SuperStar) is the joint Czech-Slovak version of Idol series' Pop Idol merged from Česko hledá SuperStar and Slovensko hľadá SuperStar which previous to that had three individual seasons each.
The third season premiered in February 2013 with castings held in Prague, Brno, Ostrava, Banská Bystrica, Bratislava and Košice. It is broadcast on two channels: «TV Nova» (Czech Republic) and «Markíza» (Slovakia) which have also been the broadcast stations for the individual seasons. Also both hosts have been their hosts countries before as have been three out of the three judges.
To legitimate a fair chance for each country's contestants to reach the final, twelve of the contestants will compete split into genders and nationalities in the semifinals, guaranteeing a in the top 12.

Regional auditions
Auditions were held in Bratislava, Košice, Prague, Ostrava, Banská Bystrica and Brno in the autumn and winter of 2012.

Divadlo
In Divadlo where 100 contestants. The contestants first emerged on stage in groups of 9 or 10 but performed solo unaccompanied, and those who did not impress the judges were cut after the group finished their individual performances. 28 made it to the next round Dlouhá cesta. 16 contestants made it to the Semi-final.

Semi-final
16 semifinalists were revealed in March when the show premiered on screen. Eight boys and eight girls competed for a spot in the top 12. Four semifinalist the lowest vote getter from each gender and country got eliminated.

Top 16 - Semi-final

Finalist

Finals
Twelve contestants made it to the finals. TOP 12 consists of 2 Slovak boys, 4 Czech boys, 3 Slovak girls and 3 Czech girls. The first single recorded by TOP 12 is called "Při tobě stát / Pri tebe stáť" (Stand next to you). Every final night has its theme. Audience can vote for contestants from the very beginning of the show, voting ends during result show on the same day.

Top 12 – No. 1 Hits

Top 11 – Czech and Slovak Hits
Mentors: Miroslav Žbirka and Jan Ledecký

Top 10 – Rock

 Group performance: "Highway to Hell" (AC/DC)

Top 9 – Movie Songs

 Group performance: "Thriller" (Michael Jackson)

Top 8 – Legends

 Group performance: 
TOP 8 - Girls: "Mamma Mia" (ABBA)
TOP 8 - Boys: "She Loves You" (The Beatles)

Top 7 – Idol's Choice

Top 6 – Love Songs

Top 5 – 1990s

 Group performance: "One" (U2)

Top 4 – Public's choice

Top 3 – Summer Hits

 Group performance: "Summer Nights" (Grease)

Top 2 – Grand Final

Elimination chart

Contestants who appeared on other seasons/shows
 Veronika Stýblová was a finalist on Česko Slovensko má talent season 1.

External links 
Official Czech homepage hosted by Nova
Official Slovak homepage hosted by Markíza

Season 03
2010s Czech television series
2010s Slovak television series
2013 Czech television seasons
2013 Slovak television seasons